Jeff Heywood (born December 20, 1951) is a former American racing driver from Mission Hills, California. A notable west coast sprint car racer, he raced in the 1980 CART Championship Car California 500 at Ontario Motor Speedway in the Pacific Coast Racing Lightning-Offy. Starting 36th, he was knocked out after 14 laps by an oil leak and was credited with 32nd place.

American Open Wheel racing results

PPG IndyCar Series 
(key) (Races in bold indicate pole position)

References

1951 births
Champ Car drivers
Living people
People from Mission Hills, Santa Barbara County, California
Racing drivers from California